The Human Rights Documentation Centre based in Delhi, India, is a non-governmental organization supporting human rights. It has a sister organisation, the South Asia Human Rights Documentation Centre, with which it publishes a journal, Human Rights Features (first issue, June 2006).

See also
 Ravi Nair

External links
 HRDC website

Human rights organisations based in India